Hugh Collins,  (born 21 June 1953) is emeritus Vinerian Professor of English Law at the University of Oxford and a fellow of All Souls College. He retains the former title as emeritus after Timothy Endicott took up the professorship on 1 July 2020.

Until 2013, Collins was the Professor of English Law and former Head of the Law Department at the London School of Economics. He was until 2013 the general editor for the Modern Law Review, the most widely read British academic law journal. Collins was educated at Pembroke College, Oxford (later teaching at Brasenose College) and Harvard Law School before joining the LSE in 1991.

Having a background in commercial law and contract law, Collins' most recent work has been focused on employment law and the possibility of regulating contracts for competitiveness and efficiency.

The LSE Law Department was rated first in the Research Assessment Exercise of 2008 while under Professor Collins' leadership.

In 2009–10 he was based in New York as Global Visiting Professor of Law at NYU.

Publications
European Civil Code: The Way Forward (2008)
(with Keith Ewing and Aileen McColgan) Labour Law, Text, Cases and Materials (2005) Hart Publishing 
Employment Law (2003) Clarendon
Contract law: Law in Context (2003) Butterworths 
Regulating Contracts (1999) Oxford University Press
Justice in Dismissal (1992) Oxford University Press
Marxism and Law (1982) Oxford University Press

Notes
COLLINS, Prof. Hugh Graham, Who's Who 2015, A & C Black, 2015; online edn, Oxford University Press, 2014

External links
eBook version of Regulating Contracts

1953 births
Living people
British legal scholars
Harvard Law School alumni
Alumni of Pembroke College, Oxford
Academics of the London School of Economics
Fellows of All Souls College, Oxford
Vinerian Professors of English Law
New York University School of Law faculty
Fellows of the British Academy